Boltonia asteroides, the white doll's daisy, false chamomile, or false aster,  is a species of plant native to the United States and Canada. It is found primarily in the Mississippi Valley and Great Plains from Saskatchewan south to Texas and Florida, with isolated populations in the eastern United States. Reports of the species in New England, New York, and the Pacific Northwest appear to be introductions.

Boltonia asteroides is a robust, 16″ to 78″ tall (40.6cm to 198.1cm), perennial. It spreads by stolons (horizontal stems running along the surface of the ground). It has many daisy-like flower heads with white or lavender ray florets and yellow disc florets.

The species is sometimes cultivated as an ornamental plant because of its attractive flowers.

Varieties
 Boltonia asteroides var. asteroides - coastal regions
 Boltonia asteroides var. latisquama (A.Gray) Cronquist - Great Plains, Mississippi Valley
 Boltonia asteroides var. recognita (Fernald & Griscom) Cronquist - Great Plains, Mississippi Valley, Ohio Valley, Canadian Prairie Provinces; introduced in New England + Pacific Northwest

References

External links
 
 
 Boltonia asteroides University of Southern Indiana

Astereae
Flora of North America
Plants described in 1767
Garden plants